Anita och Televinken was a Swedish children's programme starting at Sveriges Radio-TV 1964. Televinken was a marionette operated by Ola Lundberg, also voicing the doll. Anita Lindman Lamm played Anita.

In 1969, cooperation with Barnens trafikklubb began. Programmes aired over Sveriges Radio. The theme was teaching children how to act when out in traffic, often with song lyrics written by Gullan Bornemark, usually re-using famous tunes. In 1974, NTF and Barnens trafikklubb released Anita & Televinkens trafikskiva.

The cancellation of the traffic-related programmes has been criticized for reducing the awareness of how to act out in traffic.

References

1964 establishments in Sweden
1964 Swedish television series debuts
Swedish children's television series
Swedish television shows featuring puppetry
1960s Swedish television series